Porano is a comune (municipality) in the Province of Terni in the Italian region Umbria, located about 50 km southwest of Perugia and about 45 km northwest of Terni. As of 31 December 2004, it had a population of 1,867 and an area of 13.5 km2.

Porano borders the following municipalities: Lubriano, Orvieto.

Demographic evolution

Twin towns
 Caudrot, France

References

Cities and towns in Umbria
Hilltowns in Umbria